Howards Grove High School is a public secondary school located in Howards Grove, Wisconsin. The school serves about 320 students in grades 9 to 12 in the Howards Grove School District.

About the school
Howards Grove High School is located on 401 Audubon Road on the northwest side of the Village of Howards Grove, Wisconsin.  The current building was completed in 1994 and also houses the offices of the Howards Grove School District.  The school serves students in grades 9–12 in all of the Village of Howards Grove, the Town of Herman, half of the Town of Mosel, and parts of the Towns of Ada, Franklin, Cleveland, Sheboygan Falls, and Meeme. Additionally, through the school choice program, open enrollment is available to students outside the district.

Student performance 
Students at Howards Grove High School scored higher ACT scores than the Wisconsin State Average in the Science field, but lower in Mathematics, Reading, English, and Composite Scores. Students scored higher than the Wisconsin ACT average in Science, Mathematics, Composite Scores, but lower in English and Reading.

Students at Howards Grove High School taking AP (Advanced Placement) tests pass 87.5% of the time, significantly higher than the Wisconsin state average, and higher than all comparatively sized area schools.

28 academic credits are required to graduate from Howards Grove High School. Howards Grove High School has a 99.9% graduation rate, exceeding the Wisconsin state average. Roughly half of graduating students proceed to college studies after graduation.

Howards Grove High School has a 95.3% attendance rate, with 1.2% of students being considered habitually truant. 4.52% of students at Howards Grove High School has out of school suspensions issued.

Academic courses
Howards Grove has a variety of courses, in several departments. Students may take classes in math, social science, agriscience, communicative arts, computer science, science, music, foreign language, tech, art, and business. AP classes offered include AP Biology and AP Chemistry. AP English Language and Composition was started in the curriculum in 2009–2010, but did not have a class in the 2010–2011 school year due to a lack of interest. Students may also take such classes as Aviation, Medical Terminology, Phych, AP Psych, AP US History, and AP Calc online or at other schools in the area. Higher Level and College courses, along with other languages are also available to Seniors willing to drive to area Technical Colleges or Centers. Students may also participate in Apprenticeships, or have a work-study, where they spend time out of school working and receive credit.

Pause for a Cause
Starting in the Spring of 2012, Howards Grove High School has hosted "Pause for a Cause." This is a community fundraising event run and organized by students to raise money for a cause. Previous causes have been donations to the Children's Hospital in Milwaukee and the Make-A-Wish foundation. Events at "Pause for a Cause" have included a Brat Fry, Dodge-Ball tournament, T-shirt sales, Silent Auction, Children's Games and Activities, and even a Poker Tournament.

Music
The Howards Grove Music Department is very high-class. They have two to three choirs each year, as well as two bands. Choirs include the Mixed Choir, (Co-Ed Freshmen and Sophomores) Treble Choir, (Freshman & Sophomore Girls when there are enough) and Concert Choir (Juniors and Seniors). The Bands include the Concert Band, (Freshmen and Sophomores) and the Symphonic Band (Juniors and Seniors). The Music department has two concerts a year, one in the Winter and one in the Spring. There is also a Jazz Cabaret in the early part of the new year featuring the Jazz band and Show Choir. These are not-for-credit extra curriculars. Show choir requires an audition, whereas Jazz band does not. Band also plays Pepband for Varsity football, Varsity Basketball, and sometimes Varsity Volleyball. The Marching band Performs at halftime of the Varsity football games, featuring the poms Squad and Color-Guard, as well as marching in the Silver Dollar and Memorial Day parades. Both Band and Choir students have to opportunity to perform in Solo and Ensemble every year. While there are large ensembles that are required for band students, many in both band and choir opt to do solos, duets, trios, quartets, and various other pieces. Some students, if in both band and choir, may even perform as many as ten pieces in a single year.

Sports
Howards Grove has a Varsity and Junior-Varsity Football program, as well as Varsity and JV programs in Boys' and Girls' Basketball, Co-ed Tennis, Track, Cross-Country, Girls' Volleyball, Boys' Baseball, and Girls' Softball. They also have a Poms-Squad during Football and Basketball seasons, Boys' Varsity Soccer, and Girls' Varsity Soccer. The Cheerleading squad was not formed in the previous year due to a lack of interest among students.

Other extra-curriculars
Howards Grove is a diverse school with a wide arrangement of clubs and organizations for the students to participate in. They have a SkillsUSA, Forensics, FFA, International Club, NHS, and Spanish Honor Society. Every other year, the Howards Grove student body has the chance to perform in a musical with the Kohler students. On the opposite years, a small one-act play is available for auditions and performances.

Gallery

References

External links 
Official website

Public high schools in Wisconsin
Schools in Sheboygan County, Wisconsin
School buildings completed in 1994
1994 establishments in Wisconsin